Hanger River (also transliterated Angar River) is a river in west central Ethiopia. It is a west-flowing tributary of the Didessa River, itself a tributary of the Blue Nile (also called the Abay River in Ethiopia).

Tributaries of the Hanger include the Wajja, Alata, and Ukke rivers.

Father António Fernandes was the first European recorded to have seen the Hanger, crossing the river in 1613 as he sought a way south from Ethiopia to Malindi.

See also 
List of Ethiopian rivers

References 

Rivers of Ethiopia